The Schreder HP-21 was an American high-wing, variable geometry, V tailed, single seat motor glider project that was designed by Richard Schreder. None was ever completed or flown.

Design and development
The HP-21 project was publicly announced in August 1982 in Soaring Magazine. Schreder said at that time: "the HP-21 will out-perform any other factory-built 15-Meter racer now in production."

The propeller remained exposed when the engine was retracted. The wing incorporated a hand-crank operated retractable Dacron sailcloth flap that was intended to be extended for thermalling and retracted for glides. The flap was of triangular shape and when deployed would extend from the wing root to a point just inboard of the ailerons. The flap retracted by winding around a chrome-moly steel tube located inside the wing.

Schreder went on to start work on the HP-22 before the HP-21 was finished and, even though the prototype HP-21 carried the registration of N38100, it was never registered and there is no indication that it was ever completed or flown.

Specifications (HP-21)

See also

References

1980s United States sailplanes
Schreder aircraft
V-tail aircraft
Motor gliders
High-wing aircraft